Karl David Benson (born December 1, 1951) was the commissioner of the Sun Belt Conference where he served from 2012 until his retirement in June 2019. Previously, Benson was the commissioner of the Mid-American Conference from 1990 to 1994 and the Western Athletic Conference from 1994 to 2012.

Benson graduated from Boise State University after transferring from Spokane Falls Community College; he played baseball at both colleges.

References

External links
Sun Belt Conference bio

1951 births
Living people
Mid-American Conference commissioners
Sun Belt Conference commissioners
Western Athletic Conference commissioners
Boise State Broncos baseball players
Spokane Falls Bigfoot baseball players
Utah Utes baseball coaches